Olga Yakovleva is the name of:

 Olga Yakovleva (actress), Russian actress, frequent collaborator of the director Anatoly Efros
 Olga Yakovleva (basketball, born 1963), Russian basketball player
 Olga Yakovleva (basketball, born 1986) (died 2010), Russian basketball player
 Olga Vitalevna Yakovleva or Origa (1970–2015), Russian singer